Börje Jeppsson (14 February 1929 – 19 February 2013) was a Swedish weightlifter. He competed in the men's middle heavyweight event at the 1952 Summer Olympics.

References

External links
 

1929 births
2013 deaths
Swedish male weightlifters
Olympic weightlifters of Sweden
Weightlifters at the 1952 Summer Olympics
People from Eslöv Municipality
Sportspeople from Skåne County
20th-century Swedish people